The 1960 Pepperdine Waves football team represented George Pepperdine College as an independent during the 1960 NCAA College Division football season. The team was led by first-year head coach Pence Dacus. The Waves played home games at Sentinel Field on the campus of Inglewood High School in Inglewood, California. Pepperdine finished the season with a record of 1–9.

Schedule

Notes

References

Pepperdine
Pepperdine Waves football seasons
Pepperdine Waves football